Crazy People Music is a jazz album featuring the Branford Marsalis Quartet, led by saxophonist Branford Marsalis and featuring Kenny Kirkland, Jeff "Tain" Watts, and Robert Hurst. It was recorded January 10, February 18, and March 1, 1990 at RCA Studios in New York, New York. It peaked at number 3 on the Top Jazz Albums chart. It was nominated for a Grammy Award in 1990 for Best Jazz Instrumental Performance, Soloist.

Scott Yanow notes in his AllMusic review, "It's an impressive group… ['The Ballad of Chet Kincaid'] would catch on to a general audience, but on the others Marsalis is heard throughout in prime form, sounding more original and pushing himself."

Several critics point to Crazy People Music as a turning point for Marsalis. Nate Chinen of Jazz Times called the album the "first major statement" of Marsalis's new quartet, and Paul Wells wrote in 2014 that the album was when "the band's vision coalesced." Marsalis himself notes, "Crazy People Music was kind of a breakthrough record. We were starting to pull away from the typical post-bop stuff. We weren't really free of it yet…"

Track listing

Personnel
 Branford Marsalis - saxophones
 Jeff "Tain" Watts - drums
 Robert Hurst - bass
 Kenny Kirkland - piano

References

External links
 BranfordMarsalis.com 

1990 albums
Branford Marsalis albums
Albums produced by George Butler (record producer)